Jon Man-ho is a North Korean former footballer. He represented North Korea on at least ten occasions between 1989 and 1990.

Career statistics

International

References

Date of birth unknown
Living people
North Korean footballers
North Korea international footballers
Association football midfielders
Year of birth missing (living people)